Vosmaer is a surname. Notable people with the surname include:
 Arnout Vosmaer (1720–1799), Dutch naturalist
 Bobby Vosmaer (b. 1951), Dutch former footballer
 Carel Vosmaer (1826–1888), Dutch poet and art-critic
 Daniel Vosmaer (c. 1630–after 1666), Dutch Golden Age painter
 Gualtherus Carel Jacob Vosmaer (1854–1916), Dutch zoologist
 Jacob Vosmaer (1574–1641), Dutch Golden Age painter
 Liesbeth Vosmaer-de Bruin (born 1946), Dutch retired rower